Tecumseh is an unincorporated census-designated place in eastern Fayette Township, Vigo County, in the U.S. state of Indiana. It is part of the Terre Haute metropolitan area.

History
Located on the Wabash River, the community was named for Tecumseh, the Native American leader of the Shawnee who fought General William Henry Harrison at Fort Harrison, only a mile south of the town. Tecumseh was once known as Durkee's Ferry, and in 1890 it was merely a post-office with five or six houses. Durkee's Ferry was once one of the main crossing points on the Wabash River.

A post office was established at Tecumseh in 1882, and remained in operation until it was discontinued in 1907.

Geography

Demographics

References

Census-designated places in Indiana
Census-designated places in Vigo County, Indiana
Terre Haute metropolitan area